Smarakasilaka is a Malayalam novel written by Punathil Kunjabdulla in 1977. The story of the novel is woven around a mosque and its surroundings. The key figure is Khan Bahadur Pookkoya Thangal of the rich Arakkal family whose character is a rare mixture of dignity, benevolence and insatiable lust.

Smarakasilakal is widely regarded as the author's masterpiece. Punathil said in an interview that it is his only novel and everything else that he has written subsequently is a repetition of it with some changes. The novel won the Kerala Sahitya Akademi Award in 1978 and Sahitya Akademi Award in 1980. As of February 2013, more than 65,000 copies of the novel have been sold.

Background
In his autobiography Nashtajathakam, Kunjabdulla recalls that the seeds of Smarakasilakal were sown at a screening of Satyajit Ray's Pather Panchali in Aligarh. The novel was conceived on a large canvas and developed from the images he had formed of his hometown and its people as a child in pre-independent Malabar. Most of the characters in this novel were real-life people he knew from his hometown.

Plot summary
Smarakasilakal is set in a predominantly Muslim North Malabar village. It is the story of a feudal lord Khan Bahadur Pookkoya Thangal of the rich Arakkal family who could build a world of his own in his village. The mosque and its cemetery weave a background of traditions and legends for the tale. Every character reflects some aspect of the social set up, at the same time lives as a person of individuality. Thangal stands head and shoulders above every other character with his unbounded generosity and insatiable lust. The empire built by this man crumbles as he is killed by one of the young men whose wives he has ravished. The steward of the house grows into a tyrant. Thangal's daughter Pookunjeebi is sacrificed at the altar of wealth; his adopted son Kunjali burning for justice seems to place his trust on revolution as the only remedy for the ills that afflict society.

Main characters
 Khan Bahadur Pookkoya Thangal - a feudal lord
 Kunjali - Thangal's adopted son
 Pookunjeebi - Thangal's daughter
 Attabeevi - Thangal's wife
 Kureishi Pathu - the chief maidservant
 Eramullan - muezzin in the mosque
 Bukhari - the security guard
 Buddhan Adraman - the hostler
 Pattalam Ibrayi - the caretaker of Arakkal family after Thangal's demise

Translations
 Memorial Stones (English, Elzy Tharamangalam, Sahitya Akademi, 2003)
 Meesan Karkal (மீஸான் கற்கள்) (Tamil, Kulachal M.Yusaf, Kalachuvadu Pathipagam, 2004)
 Smaraka Silalu (స్మారక శిలలు) (Telugu, Nalimela Bhaskar, Sahitya Akademi, 2010)

Adaptations

In 2009, a film adaptation of the novel was released, starring Jagathy Sreekumar as Pookkoya Thangal, and directed by M. P. Sukumaran Nair. The film is an entire re-depiction of the novel. Sukumaran Nair told in an interview: "I firmly believe that it is not the work of a director to literally translate a fiction into a film. Fiction should be modified to suit the entirely different medium of cinema." The film was critically acclaimed and won two Kerala State Film Awards: Second Best Film and Special Jury Award (Jagathy Sreekumar).

Also, All India Radio broadcast a play based on the novel through the programme Arangu in 2007.

Awards
 1978: Kerala Sahitya Akademi Award (Novel)
 1980: Kendra Sahitya Akademi Award
 2013: Kendra Sahitya Puraskar for the Telugu translation by Nalimela Bhaskar titled Smaraka Silalu

References

External links
 Smarakasilakal at DC Books Official website
 Smarakasilakal at Keralaliterature.com

1977 novels
Malayalam novels
Indian novels adapted into films
Novels set in Kerala
Sahitya Akademi Award-winning works
Kerala Sahitya Akademi Award-winning works
DC Books books
1977 Indian novels